Matt Salter (born 2 December 1976 in Greenwich, London) is an English former rugby union, and professional rugby league footballer who played in the 1990s and 2000s. He played for Bristol in the Guinness Premiership. He primarily played as a Flanker or in the Second Row.

Rugby career
An iconic player for Bristol, Salter captained the club for four consecutive seasons from 2004-2008. During this time Bristol regained its position in the Guinness Premiership, and finished third in the table in the 2006-07 season. He was named as captain of the Guinness Premiership Dream Team in 2006.

Salter started his career playing for London & South East Schools, and appeared in the back row for England Schools 18 Group A against New Zealand. He played in National League 2 South for Blackheath in the 1995-96 season, making his début in the second row against London Irish.

He went on to play rugby league and appeared for Great Britain Under 19s against New Zealand. Salter played for the London Broncos in the Super League, and was in the starting line-up (as a ) for them in the 1999 Rugby League Challenge Cup Final, led out by the club backer at the time, Richard Branson. Although the London Broncos started well, the greater experience of the Leeds Rhinos eventually resulted in a record 52-16 victory for the Leeds Rhinos.

His Bristol career started in the autumn of 1999. Bristol were back in rugby's top flight after a year in Allied Dunbar Premiership Two, and Salter was offered a contract, making his début on 28 November as a replacement in the home European Shield game with Calvisano.

He played for the club from 1999 until 2009 with just one season away with Leeds. Despite having a two-year contract at Leeds, he grabbed the opportunity to join Richard Hill's rejuvenated Bristol side a season later, returning to the club as captain. He took a gamble in stepping down a flight to play with Bristol, but it turned out to be the right decision. At the end of his first season as captain he was celebrating Bristol's promotion back to the Guinness Premiership.

Post Rugby Playing career
Following his retirement from professional rugby, Salter became the Director of Rugby (union) at the University of Bristol. He is currently Head Coach at Clifton Rugby and, alongside Danny Grewcock, Director of Rugby at Clifton College.

He is married with 2 children.

References

External links
(archived by archive.is) Bristol Rugby profile
Leeds Carnegie profile
Rugby League Project stats
Salter to rejoin Bristol
Salter hit with ban

1976 births
Living people
Bristol Bears players
English rugby league players
English rugby union players
Leeds Tykes players
London Broncos players
People educated at St Dunstan's College
People from Greenwich
Rugby league players from Greater London
Rugby league second-rows
Rugby union players from Greenwich
Rugby union props